The University of Michigan Museum of Art in Ann Arbor, Michigan with  is one of the largest university art museums in the United States. Built as a war memorial in 1909 for the university's fallen alumni from the Civil War, Alumni Memorial Hall originally housed U-M's Alumni office along with the university's growing art collection. Its first director was Jean Paul Slusser, who served from 1946 (first as acting director, then becoming director in 1947) to his retirement in 1957.

The university contains a comprehensive collection that represents more than 150 years of history, with over 20,000 works of art that span cultures, eras, and media. Admission is free, but a $10 donation is suggested.

In the spring of 2009, the museum reopened after a major $41.9 million expansion and renovation designed by Brad Cloepfil and Allied Works Architecture, which more than doubled the size of the museum. The museum's current director is Christina Olsen, who was appointed in 2017.

Construction 

Alumni Memorial Hall was originally conceived in 1864 as a way to honor the University of Michigan students, faculty, and alumni who had died fighting in the Civil War. However, the project was put on hold until 1904, when a committee of Michigan alumni and professors, led by Professor Martin Luther D'Ooge and Judge Claudius B. Grant, secured a promissory note from the Board of Regents for the land the hall would eventually be built on.

With the land set aside, the Board of Regents created a committee to work in parallel with the Alumni Memorial Committee in 1905, and by the end of the year had awarded the project to the Detroit architecture firm Donaldson and Meier at the cost of $175,000. The hall's cornerstone was laid by Judge Grant and construction began in June 1908. Alumni Memorial Hall was dedicated on May 11, 1910, with a final building cost of $190,000.

The hall itself was built in the neoclassical tradition with a pair of two stone columns flanking the hall's main bronze doors with two smaller side doors. The inside continues to house the Alumni Association's headquarters and the university's vast art collection alongside pieces donated by alumni, including a bust of the university's first president Henry Philip Tappan. It also housed the University Club, before the club moved across the street to the Union.

Artwork

Permanent collection 
The museum's permanent collection includes work by James McNeill Whistler, Franz Kline, Helen Frankenthaler, Pablo Picasso, Joshua Reynolds, Claude Monet, Max Beckmann, Walker Evans, Randolph Rogers, Kara Walker, Alvin D. Loving, Christian Boltanski, Donald Sultan, Jenny Holzer, Tracey Emin, Louise Nevelson, Yinka Shonibare, Romare Bearden, Michele Oka Doner, Hiram Powers, Mark di Suvero, Tiffany & Co., Katsushika Hokusai, Utagawa Toyokuni I, Shigeo Fukuda, and Alexander Calder, among many others.

Outdoor artwork 
The Mark di Suvero sculpture Orion was installed in front of the building from 2008 to 2018, then removed briefly for conservation, and reinstalled permanently in 2019. 

The kinetic sculpture Shang was a long-term loan to the university that stood outside the building from 2008 to 2020, when it was bought by a private collector. In November 2020, the Jaume Plensa piece Behind the Walls was installed in its place.

Other sculptures outside of the museum include Daedalus by Charles Ginnever, Ternary Marker by Beverly Pepper, Stiff Box No. 12 by Lucas Samaras, Requiem by Erwin Binder, and a trio of pieces by Michele Oka Doner.

Temporary exhibitions 
Temporary exhibitions at the museum have included work by Meleko Mokgosi, Mari Katayama, Ceal Floyer, Paul Rand, and others.

Gallery

See also
Cranbrook Art Museum
Detroit Institute of Arts
Museums at the University of Michigan
Tourism in metropolitan Detroit
Michigan in the American Civil War

References

External links
 Official University of Michigan Museum of Art website
Search the University of Michigan Museum of Art collection
Descriptive Catalogue of the Museum of Art and Antiquities
University of Michigan Museum of Art within Google Arts & Culture

University of Michigan campus
University museums in Michigan
Art museums and galleries in Michigan
Museums in Ann Arbor, Michigan
Modernist architecture in Michigan
1909 establishments in Michigan
Modern art museums in the United States
Contemporary art galleries in the United States
Art museums established in 1909
Michigan in the American Civil War
African art museums in the United States
Museums of American art
University of Michigan